Ranunculus peduncularis is a large perennial buttercup that grows in Patagonia on the margins of woods, scrubs and along streams, with long stems and deeply divided leaves. In the wild it flowers from spring to summer.

Description 
The flowers of 3½ cm (1.4 in) in diameter stand alone or with two or three together on a stem. The ten to twenty-two oblong petals are glossy rich yellow. In the variety erodiifolius the leaf is more deeply cut and the segments are narrower.

Distribution and ecology 
Ranunculus peduncularis is known from Chile and Argentina, where it grows from the central cordilleras in the North to Tierra del Fuego in the South, on grassy banks of stream, in meadows with scrubs and on the margin of woods, between sea level to  depending on latitude. In Argentina the species has been found in the provinces Chubut, Mendoza, Neuquen, Rio Negro, Santa Cruz, and Tierra del Fuego, in Chile it occurs in the provinces Coquimbo, Valparaiso, O'Higgins, Maule, Bio Bio, Araucania, Los Lagos, Aisen, Magallanes, and Region Metropolitana.

References 

peduncularis